Clepsis monticolana is a species of moth of the family Tortricidae. It is found in Japan on the island of Honshu.

The wingspan is 18–24 mm.

References

Moths described in 1964
Clepsis